This is a list of player movements for Super Rugby teams prior to the end of the 2022 Super Rugby Pacific season. Departure and arrivals of all players that were included in a Super Rugby squad for 2021 or 2022 are listed here, regardless of when it occurred. Future-dated transfers are only included if confirmed by the player or his agent, his former team or his new team.

Notes
 2021 players listed are all players that were named in the initial senior squad, or subsequently included in a 23-man match day squad at any game during the season.
 (did not play) denotes that a player did not play at all during one of the two seasons due to injury or non-selection. These players are included to indicate they were contracted to the team.
 (short-term) denotes that a player wasn't initially contracted, but came in during the season. This could either be a club rugby player coming in as injury cover, or a player whose contract had expired at another team (typically in the northern hemisphere).
 (development squad) denotes a player that wasn't named in the original squad, but was announced as signing as a development player. These are often younger players or club players. Different teams use different names for development players. Other names used include (wider training group) or (wider training squad).
 Flags are only shown for players moving to or from another country.
 Players may play in several positions, but are listed in only one.

Australia

Fiji

Drua

The Fijian Drua will join Super Rugby in 2022, with New Zealand Rugby Union selecting them as preferred partners to join the competition. By February 2021, Fiji Rugby Union had completed the business plan for the team and was searching for additional funding for the side. On 14 April 2021, New Zealand Rugby Union confirmed the side had been granted a licence to join the Super Rugby competition. The team was officially confirmed in the competition in August 2021.

New Zealand

Pacific Islands

Moana Pasifika

Moana Pasifika will join Super Rugby in 2022, with New Zealand Rugby Union selecting them as preferred partners to join the competition. The team will be made up of players from Pacific Islands such as Fiji, Samoa and Tonga. The team will likely be based in New Zealand, with Auckland being suggested as a base for the side. On 14 April 2021, New Zealand Rugby Union confirmed the side had been granted a conditional licence to join the Super Rugby competition, before on 12 July 2021, granting the side a full licence to join the competition.

See also

 List of 2021–22 Premiership Rugby transfers
 List of 2021–22 United Rugby Championship transfers
 List of 2021–22 Top 14 transfers
 List of 2021–22 RFU Championship transfers
 List of 2021–22 Rugby Pro D2 transfers
 List of 2021–22 Major League Rugby transfers
 SANZAAR
 Super Rugby franchise areas

References

2021
2021 Super Rugby season
2022 Super Rugby Pacific season